Bridge International School is an English-medium co-ed school located at Hazra road, Kolkata, West Bengal, India.

History
The school was established in 2003 and it is affiliated to Cambridge International Examinations, University of Cambridge, United Kingdom.

See also
Education in India
List of schools in India
Education in West Bengal

References

External links 
 

Cambridge schools in India
International schools in Kolkata
Educational institutions established in 2003
Boarding schools in West Bengal
2003 establishments in West Bengal